Alexander Richard Pettyfer (born 10 April 1990) is a British actor and model. He appeared in school plays and on television before being cast as Alex Rider, the main character in the 2006 film version of Stormbreaker. Pettyfer was nominated for a Young Artist Award and an Empire Award for his role.

Pettyfer has been seen as a model in several advertising campaigns for Burberry and has starred in a number of other films, including I Am Number Four, Beastly, and Magic Mike. He starred as Brody in the Netflix science fiction miniseries The I-Land.

Early life
Pettyfer was born in Stevenage, Hertfordshire, England, the son of Lee Robinson, an actress and Richard Pettyfer, an actor. Both parents met while performing in London's West End in West Side Story, Cats and Miss Saigon. He has a younger half-brother, James Ireland from his mother's remarriage to Michael J. Ireland, a retired builder and property developer.

Pettyfer was brought up in Esher and then Windsor, Berkshire and began his career initially being managed by his mother as a young fashion model at the age of seven, for Gap, after meeting Ralph Lauren in a toy store in New York. He also did advertisements for some yogurt brands. His first commercial was at age six.

As a schoolboy, he performed in plays, including in the role of Willy Wonka in a production of Charlie and the Chocolate Factory, Jack in his school play "Jack and the Beanstalk" and Robin Hood in the adaptation of The Adventures of Robin Hood (1938). Pettyfer was educated at two junior independent schools: The Mall School, a small school in Twickenham, followed by the Lambrook Haileybury school in Winkfield, Berkshire. He subsequently attended two other independent boarding schools: Millfield School in Street, Somerset and Shiplake College near Henley-on-Thames in Oxfordshire. Before his GCSEs, he left Shiplake College to attend the independent Sylvia Young Theatre School in London.

Career
In 2005, Pettyfer made his professional acting début in the British television production of Tom Brown's Schooldays, playing the lead character, Tom Brown; he received positive reviews for the role. In June 2005, he was cast in his most prominent role so far, that of teenage MI6 spy Alex Rider in the film Stormbreaker, based on the novel by Anthony Horowitz. He was one of 500 who auditioned for the role. Pettyfer chose to appear in the film over a role in the film Eragon, noting that he preferred Stormbreaker because it would be filmed in Britain, in the Isle of Man, while Eragon would film in Hungary; Pettyfer has a fear of flying, and he liked the looks of the cast for Stormbreaker. In 2006, Stormbreaker was released on 21 July in the United Kingdom, 6 October in the United States, and 21 September in Australia.

One review of Pettyfer's performance described him as playing the role with an "earnest intensity", although another noted that he "isn't quite at ease as an actor". Media reports specified that the film was expected to make Pettyfer a "teen idol". In September 2006, it was reported that Pettyfer would not reprise the role if there was another Alex Rider film because he had become too mature for the role.

At around age 17, due to his earlier acting success and to supplement his income, Pettyfer started modelling, notably in some advertising campaigns for Burberry.

He next appeared in Wild Child, a film set in California, Kent and Yorkshire part of which took place at Cobham Hall Girls' School in Kent. He played schoolboy Freddie Kingsley. In 2009, he played the callous ringleader of a group of cool but cruel teenagers who are picked off one by one by the ghost of one of their former victims, in the horror-comedy Tormented.

He starred in the film Beastly, based on the novel by Alex Flinn. He finished filming on 13 August 2009, and the film was released on 4 March 2011. Pettyfer portrayed the main character in I Am Number Four, released in February 2011 and directed by D.J. Caruso.

He was offered the part of Jace Wayland in the film adaption of Cassandra Clare's best selling book, City of Bones. Jamie Campbell Bower was later cast as Jace Wayland. Pettyfer had also been offered a part in a film adaption of Joseph Delaney's The Wardstone Chronicles, but he declined the role. He was in line to star in The Paperboy, based on the Pete Dexter novel of the same name, but was dropped for the role. In 2012, he played Adam, a 19-year-old who enters the world of male stripping in Magic Mike.

In 2013, Pettyfer had a small role as Thomas Westfall in The Butler. In 2014, he starred in the romantic drama Endless Love. In 2016, Pettyfer played the role of Jerry Schilling in the biography film Elvis & Nixon. In 2017, he starred as Nick in the indie thriller The Strange Ones directed by Christopher Radcliff and Lauren Wolkstein. 2018 saw Pettyfer making his directorial debut in Back Roads where he also played the lead role of Harley Altmyer.

In 2018, Pettyfer starred as Stephen Underwood, a journalist who uncovers the horrific murder of 22,000 Poles under Stalin's instructions, in the post–World War II thriller The Last Witness. In the same year, it was announced that Pettyfer had been cast in the main role of Brody on the Netflix science fiction miniseries The I-Land. The miniseries was released on 12 September 2019.

Personal life
In June 2009, Pettyfer was voted number 35 on British women's magazine Company's list of the top 50 most eligible bachelors. In August 2009, the British magazine Glamour ranked him number 21 on their list of the sexiest men on the planet.

After Pettyfer completed filming Stormbreaker, he did not discuss the film with anyone at his school, citing the advice of his Stormbreaker star Ewan McGregor, who told him to keep his personal and professional lives separate. Pettyfer subsequently decided to leave school without any qualifications and concentrate on his film career, saying that "When you have already experienced going out and working in the real world, and you come back to school, you just see it as a playground and you don't want to be there any more".

In a 2011 interview, he stated "I felt like the industry was just a factory. You hear a lot of people say they want to make art in this industry, but so few people actually fucking do it. I was disillusioned by Hollywood at the time, but now I've come to accept that's just the way things are: it's called show business, not show art." In the same interview, when asked about how he liked living in Los Angeles, he stated, "LA is growing on me a little bit, but it's still a shit-hole. I think it's this insidious pool where nearly everyone lives in fear. Geographically it's fantastic: in a half hour, you can be on the beach in one direction, go snowboarding in another, or go out into the desert. But socially it's disgusting. I wish they'd just run all the cunts out."

In July 2010, he began dating actress Dianna Agron, his I Am Number Four co-star. He was reportedly controlling and paranoid throughout their relationship, but they began cohabiting in 2010. The couple broke up in February 2011, the day after the film was released, with reports that Pettyfer threatened Agron over the phone and had a "heated confrontation" with actor Sebastian Stan, someone with whom Agron was close in early 2011. She temporarily moved to a hotel under a false name so that Pettyfer would not be able to find her, and he was instructed to not attend an event where she would be present.

Pettyfer was briefly engaged to actress Riley Keough in 2012. They met while filming Magic Mike.

On 24 December 2019, he became engaged to German model Toni Garrn after ten months of dating. They were married in Hamburg, Germany, on 2 October 2020. They have a daughter, born in 2021. On 19 June 2022, he and Garrn had a second marriage ceremony on the island of Paros, Greece.

Filmography

Film

Television

Directorial

Modelling
 2008: Burberry – Spring/Summer
 2008: Burberry – The Beat For Men eau de cologne
 2009: Burberry – Spring/Summer

Awards and nominations

References

External links
 
 

Living people
1990 births
21st-century English male actors
British child models
British expatriates in Germany
English male child actors
English male film actors
English male models
English male television actors
Male actors from Hertfordshire
People educated at The Mall School
People educated at Millfield
People educated at Shiplake College
People from Stevenage